The following is a list of county roads in Marion County, Florida. All county roads are maintained by the county in which they reside.

County routes in Marion County

References

FDOT map of Marion County
FDOT GIS data, accessed January 2014

 
County